Buckskin is a small unincorporated community in Barton Township, Gibson County, Indiana. Although unincorporated, Buckskin has the ZIP code 47647.

A post office was established at Buckskin in 1847, and remained in operation until it was discontinued in 1989.

Geography
Nearby towns are Mackey and Somerville.

Schools
Buckskin and the easternmost half of Gibson County is served by the East Gibson School Corporation which currently operates five schools:

Wood Memorial High School (9-12)
Wood Memorial Junior High School (7-8)
Oakland City Elementary School (PK-6)
Francisco Elementary School (K-6)
Barton Township Elementary School (K-6)

References

Communities of Southwestern Indiana
Evansville metropolitan area
Unincorporated communities in Gibson County, Indiana
Unincorporated communities in Indiana